Rodney Edward Webb (born 18 August 1943) is a former  international rugby union player.

He was capped twelve times as a wing for England between 1967 and 1972.

References

1943 births
Living people
Barbarian F.C. players
Coventry R.F.C. players
England international rugby union players
English rugby union players
Rugby union players from Rugby, Warwickshire
Rugby union wings